Stephen M. Coan is an American environmentalist and educator. He currently serves as CEO emeritus and served as president and chief executive officer of Sea Research Foundation between 2006 and 2022. He is chair of the Connecticut Tourism Advisory Council, appointed by Governor Ned Lamont to that position in 2021. Based in Mystic, Conn., Sea Research Foundation operates Mystic Aquarium, one of the nation's leading marine mammal research centers with a focus on conservation, education and research.  With over 800,000 annual visitors, Mystic Aquarium is the largest cultural attraction in Connecticut and one of the largest in New England.  The Aquarium also serves over 100,000 students annually through a suite of education programs including undergraduate, graduate and post-graduate courses, fellowships, and internships, offered in collaboration with University of Connecticut, University of Rhode Island, Mitchell College, Springfield College, and Tufts University.  Several undergraduate and graduate programs are funded by the National Science Foundation and the Office of Naval Research.

Education 

Coan was born in Boston and earned his bachelor's degree from Brandeis University and both a masters in management and doctorate in social policy from the Heller Graduate School at Brandeis.  His doctoral dissertation included an examination of the role of public-private partnerships in the implementation of legislatively and judicially ordered public policies.

Activism 

Coan is a long-time advocate for stewardship of the oceans, and has called on the U.S. government to designate additional Marine Protected Areas and to give existing ones more funding. He has spoken in favor of Senate approval of the International Law of the Sea Treaty, coastal and marine spatial planning to protect vital resources, enhanced management for fisheries, and emerging understanding of the economic and social impact of ocean conservation. His early work focused on incorporating ocean education into national science education standards.

Coan advocates for improved science, technology, engineering and mathematics education, and has written opinion pieces for major newspapers and lectured at colleges and universities throughout the United States. He was a member of the National Science Foundation's review panel to study proposals for its National Science, Technology, Engineering, and Mathematics Education Digital Library (NSDL).  Coan has published numerous articles and speeches on ocean conservation, environmental justice and the efficacy of public-private partnerships.  He has served on state commissions and councils in Connecticut related to the environment, education, law enforcement and tourism.  He has worked with the United States Department of Justice for over a decade on implementation of youth mentoring programs that utilize ocean and watershed conservation projects to link law enforcement officers with at-risk youth in communities throughout the nation.

Professional career 
Coan began his career as a college admissions officer and then worked for several years as a youth outreach counselor in Appalachia and then Boston.  He has held faculty appointments at Tufts University, Bentley University and Cambridge College.  He was the chief education officer, and later President and CEO for JASON Learning, leading the development and implementation of the widely acclaimed international STEM program using distance learning technologies to engage scientists as mentors and role models.  The program pioneers use of the Internet and digital technologies in the classroom, as well as hands-on and inquiry-based learning methodologies.  The organization was a collaborative between the United States Department of Energy, NASA, NOAA, Woods Hole Oceanographic Institute, University of Rhode Island, Lehigh University and large private sector organizations including National Geographic Society, Exxon Mobil, Honeywell and others.  The program has served more than 10 million students and teachers.

Coan has been an officer of Sea Research Foundation since 2001, was appointed Executive Vice President and Chief Operating Officer in 2004 and as President and CEO in 2006. He has served on a variety of boards including Chairman of the Chamber of Commerce of Eastern Connecticut, Horizons in Windham CT, Feinstein Family Foundation, Stonington Police Commission, Connecticut Commission on Tourism, Governor's Advisory Council on Tourism, Governor's Transition Committee on Energy and Environment, National Marine Sanctuary Foundation, Pine Point School and the Cal Ripken Sr. Foundation in Baltimore, Md. He was a founding trustee of the North American Marine Environment Protection Association (NAMEPA). His leadership roles have included several chairmanships of organizations and committees, and leading strategic planning processes for the National Marine Sanctuary Foundation, Ripken Foundation and Chamber of Commerce of Eastern Connecticut. He has also served as a senior advisor to the Chairman and CEO of Resorts World Singapore on the construction and opening of the Southeast Asia Aquarium on Sentosa Island in Singapore.

Coan received the William Crawford Distinguished Service Award and was honored at the White House for Mystic Aquarium's work with at-risk youth and other community engagement in fostering ocean and watershed conservation and education. He has been honored by Urban Tech, Coastal America, and Brandeis University.

References 

Tufts University faculty
Bentley University faculty
American environmentalists
Living people
People from Mystic, Connecticut
Year of birth missing (living people)
Scientists from Boston